Albenga is a city and comune situated on the Gulf of Genoa on the Italian Riviera in the Province of Savona in Liguria, northern Italy. Albenga has the nickname of city of a hundred spires. The economy is mostly based on tourism, local commerce and agriculture. Albenga has six hamlets: Lusignano, San Fedele, Campochiesa, Leca, Bastia, Salea.

History
Albenga was founded around the 4th century BC on the slopes of the coastal hill. Albenga used to be  the capital of the Ingauni a Ligurian  tribe. The Ingauners were  sailors traders and they  owned  a large territory between Finale and Sanremo.

During the Second Punic War the town of Albenga was  allied with the Carthaginians, but was defeated by the Romans under proconsul Lucius Aemilius Paullus Macedonicus in 181 BC. The following year the Romans and the Ingauni signed a  foedus (alliance agreement) which started the total Romanization of the whole region. Put under Latin rights in 89 BC, Albingaunum was granted Roman citizenship in 45 BC under Julius Caesar, starting to enjoy, with the beginning of the Empire, a period of prosperity. A further boost for the city came from the building of the Via Julia Augusta (13 BC), linked   with southern France and Spain. In the meantime the intense exploitation of the flat land around the city continued; an inscription records the restoration of the walls, forum, and harbor, by Constantius in A.D. 354.

During the 5th century, the city suffered from raids by the Visigoths, who partly destroyed and looted  Albenga. The old Municipium, which now is in  disastrous conditions, was rebuilt through the intervention of emperor Constantius III who gave the city stability and a defensive structure that allowed the town to survive through the following centuries. Albenga established itself as a medieval municipality in 1098; in that same year Albenga joined to  the First Crusade with its own banner, troops and money, receiving the  rights of free trade by the King of Jerusalem. From that time on, the Golden Red Cross flag  was displayed on its own ships and towers.

Later on, after the invasion of northern Italy by emperor Frederick Barbarossa, the city supported him and joined  to Ghibelline coalition which was never abandoned during the following centuries. In 1159  Albenga received  the imperial investiture for all its territory.

In 1798 Albenga was declared capital of the Centa Jurisdiction, as part of the short living constitution of the Ligurian Republic. In 1815 the city, together with the whole  Liguria, was assigned to the Savoia ( the Italian Royal family) and became part of the Kingdom of Sardinia. The town was  the head city of  the new  province of Albenga. The new district  was formed with all municipalities from Andora and Finale Ligure including the country side .

In 1863, after the unification of Italy, the province was reduced to a district, and was abolished completely in 1927. In this time  Albenga was reduced to an agricultural village, overtaken by other coastal towns in both economic and demographic development. Albenga wasn't a popular  holiday destination  like other towns in the Italian Riviera.

The name
The name of Albenga comes from the Latin Albíngaunum that comes from Album Ingaunum, that  it means the capital city + genitive plural in -um.  The ethnonym Ingauni ( Ingauners) consists of Indo-European origin, and a name of Gaulish-ligurian land. Album comes from alb o alp  an ancient pre-Indo-European (rock, hill), often erroneously associated to "album" a Latin word meaning white or clear. The first name was Album Ingaunum, but when it was conquered by the Romans, the name became Albingaunum; after the Roman Empire the name became Albinauno and near the 1000 became Albingano. Only in the 14th century  the name  has become Albenga.

Geography

Albenga is located in the western coast of the  Italian Riviera. It has a homonymous plain at the mouth of the river Centa, which over the centuries has been the architect of the Albenga's plain, remodeling the ground several times and forcing the Albenga people to adopt embankments and bridges since its foundation. Up to the 17th century, Albenga based its economy on maritime trade, as the city was built on the mouth  of the  river Centa and it was surrounded by walls and bridges.  During the time the river Centa has changed its natural path.
When  Albenga was annexed to the Republic of Genoa, the Republic chose to bury the port  to punish the rebel city and stop any possible rebellion and like natural event. Nowadays  the river flows along the  city centre  flowing to the mouth river. Even the memory of the old bridges was deleting itself.
Albenga  is the main city  of the district Albenganese, which extends from Finale to Andora and all countryside.
The  Gallinara island is included  into this district. Apparently in the island used to  live St. Martin of Tours.  In the island there is   a monastery dedicated to the saint. 
Since  1064  the island has become propriety  of the abbey of Abbadia Alpina.

Climate
The climate is mild along the coast, with mild winters and warm summers, hardly ever summers  are very hot  because  the coast is  mitigated by the sea breeze. The  countryside of the plain of Albenga  has got  more continental characteristics: winters  are colder and the  summer is hotter than the sea part.

Main sights
Built on the ancient orthogonal structure that had the current "Via Medaglie d'oro" and "Via Enrico d'Aste" respectively as the Roman camp main road axes (cardo and decumanus), the town has its planimetric hub in the historical San Michele Square. Around it some palaces were built, which were historically the seats of political and religious authorities.

Cathedral of St Michael Archangel

Built on the basic structures of the early Christian basilica put up by orders of Constantius III between the 4th and 5th century, it has a façade with traces of the transformation from Romanesque to Gothic. From this same period are the two lateral portals of the main facade and a third one the left side of the church, that hosts a restored Lombard bas-relief; the central portal dates from 1669.

The current design is the result of further elevations. The restoration works between 1964 and 1967 brought back the cathedral design to its original medieval aspect. The nearby steeple was attached to the church in the 13th century, built over the ruins of the old bell tower between the years 1391 and 1395. This construction is one of the last local examples of the use of bare bricks, progressively replaced by plastering.

Albenga Baptistery

The baptistery is located to the side of the cathedral, as it was typical of the early Christian structures, and can be visited from the Loggia of the old City Hall Palace. It has an octagonal interior dating to the 5th century. The current appearance dates from a late 19th-century restoration work, carried on by Alfredo D'Andrade. During those works, the original basin vaulted roof, built with the Byzantine-Ravennate technique of the "tubi fittili" (terracotta tubes), was completely destroyed. The mosaic decorations of the vault of the presbytery go back to the 5th and 6th centuries.

Old City Hall Palace

Dating back to the early 14th century, it has undergone several renovations over the years before receiving its present appearance.

It housed the Council Hall (the big bell still calls the citizens when the council committee meets in the new town hall) and the jail. The lower floor dates from the 14th century, while the upper one was reconstructed in 1387–1391. The façade towards the baptistery has Ghibelline-style merlons with two large staircases. Since 1933, it houses the Ingauni Museum. The latter, established in 1933 by Nino Lamboglia, collects objects and medieval Roman (sculptures, inscriptions, sarcophagi and 15th-century frescoes), archaeological and epigraphic collections.

Old Bishop's Palace
Located near the baptistery, it dates from the 11th century, with a 13th-century portal. It is the seat of the local bishop and houses the Holy Art Museum. The wing leading to the baptistery show several construction phases from the 13th and 14th centuries. The decoration with black and white stripes was added in 1463 under bishop Napoleone Fieschi. The heraldic fresco is by Giovanni Canavesio (1477).

The Diocesan Museum of Albenga occupies a series of rooms decorated with frescoes, it houses works of art and findings from the excavation of the cathedral. Among the paintings stand out a St. John attributed to Caravaggio and The Martyrdom of Saint Catherine by Guido Reni.

Ancient remains
Restructured by Emperor Augustus in 13 BC, the Via Julia Augusta was the most important communication link in the Italian Riviera  until the construction of the Napoleonic situated  close  to the sea; the current site of the Via Aurelia. Its path, with plenty of Roman buildings destined to funerary celebrations, makes an archaeological walk beautiful also from a panoramic and naturalistic point of view.

Albenga is also home to the remains of a Roman amphitheatre dating from the 3rd century BC. It represents the only example of theatrical construction knowns on the entire Western part of the Italian Riviera.  Albenga is placed to a short distance  from the Amphitheatre and the Via Julia Augusta. The funeral monument  is called the  Pilone, standing over the eastern slope of the Mount. This is the most renowned and characteristic Ingauner  funeral monument.

Also in the mount area is the Palaeo-Christian Basilica of S. Calocero (4th–5th century). It has built on the latter martyr's tomb.

Other archaeological side and interest points are:
South of the historical center is an archaeological area discovered during the excavations for the enlargement of the river banks  between 20and 2002. Here, by the river, were found the ruins of the old thermal system and  the early Christian site with  the medieval San Clemente Church.
Pontelungo ("Long Bridge"), a medieval water main  (c. 13th century). The Sanctuary of Nostra Signora di Pontelungo (early 18th century) is located close .
Palazzo Peloso Cepolla (16th century). It has  got a corner tower since  the 13th century. The entrance hall houses a fresco depicting the Roman usurper Proculus, while the piano nobile has got several Renaissance and Roman marble busts. It is home of the  Roman Naval Museum, established in 1950. It shows  more than a thousand Roman amphorae recovered from a ship in the 1st century BC, sank in the waters of Albenga. It was the first Roman cargo ship discovered and explored the bottom of the Ligurian Sea.  There is also a section regarding   the caves of prehistoric materials from val Pennavaira.
Torre Oddo, a tower with typical Ghibelline merlons
The latter brought the three Renaissance-style peperino lions from which the square has  taken its name in 1608.
 Museum of the Oil Civilization. Located in an old mill site owned by the family Sommariva, it is an ethnographic exhibition dedicated to the processing of olives, olive oil and wine.

Tourism

Besides being an important historical town, Albenga is a coastal and touristic resort town of the Italian Riviera. 
The  coast of Albenga  has a length of some 4 km (2.48 miles) of fine sand mixed with pebbles, with bathing establishments. The coast is  divided in small public beaches and other managed and fully  beach equipped ran by private entrepreneurs. The sea promenade is long  3 km (1.86 miles)

The private island of Gallinara is less than one naval mile from Albenga.

Educations

Albenga is home to the following secondary schools:

 Professional Institute of Agriculture and the Environment "Domenico Aicardi".
 State Industrial Technical Institute "Galileo Galilei".
 Scientific High School "Giordano Bruno with attached classical section" Giovanni Pascoli "*Educational Diocesan"
 "Redemptoris Mater" Diocesan School Center, high-school with classic section and socio-psycho-pedagogical
 Diocesan Seminary historic institution that for centuries, along with Palazzo Oddo, has educated citizens. Currently active in the modern home built by Angelo Cambiaso and active in the education of future priests of the diocese.

The Higher Institute of Religious Studies (often abbreviated ISSR) is a university that promotes the study and scientific research on religion.

Typical dishes 

Local delicacies include:

 Purple Asparagus
 zucchini trumpet
 artichoke
 beefsteak tomato
 The biscuits with fennel seeds, called in local dialect Baxin d'Arbenga ("Kiss of Albenga")
 The extra virgin olive oil Taggiasca
  [Genoese Pesto]
 The "caviar" of Centa
 Farinata, a  type of unleavened pancake or crêpe  made from chickpea flour  
 Fritters  of Bianchetti
 Focaccia Genoese a type  of Italian  flatbread 
 Ciappe oil
 olives Taggiasca in brine
 Peaches with Pigato

Drinks include:

 White wines Pigato, Vermentino and Lumassina
 The red wines Ormeasco and Rossese
 Grappa with artichoke and bitter orange
 Liquor violet asparagus

Main Events

 Palio dei Rioni Ingauni: Fourth July weekend, a festival  regarding the four neighbourhood of the old town:  St. Giovanni, St. Eulalia, San Siro and Santa Maria; all contender  are  wearing  medieval dresses. 
  Celebration  of Madonna di Pontelungo : on 2nd July with the  religious procession, stalls and  fireworks;
  Green Night: The first Saturday of September, a festival  called  la notte verde ( the green night) because the town is decorated with plants, flowers and vegetables;
  Albenga Flower: spring flower festival in the old town of Albenga;
 Sagralea: A big festival regarding the Wine Pigato and other quality wines of the Italian Riviera in the last week of August  at  the hamlet of Salea. This event is included in "Road of Wine and Oil";
 Festival Du Burgu: it takes place in the hamlet  of Bastia in  the last week of August;
 Festival du Michettin: in the locality of San Giorgio, a festival regarding  the local dish called Michettin in Ligurian dialect  (pan fritto in italian and bread fried in English);
  Celebration of Saint Michael: Albenga  celebrates  its saint patron on 29th September;
  Celebration of Saint Lucia: Felt celebration for southern Italy emigrants on 13th December;
 Diocesan Gathering brotherhoods: The first Sunday in September, where for the occasion  the fraternities of Diocese of Albenga-Imperia gather marching in procession with their insignia and artistic crucified.
  National Piano Competition "Città di Albenga '''  It takes place 27th–30th December;
 Apple House Party  Festival of music and play "Head On": a prestigious festival that features national artists;
  Trophy  National Albingaunum: National Award for  the Literature;
 Trophy of Wood Slingshot:  Particular trophy  invented and organized by "fieui of Caruggi". It consists to give a reward  to someone  he has shot a good slingshot. The slings is just a metaphor; the trophy is a reward  for everyone has done something to help and defend people in difficulties.

Notable residents

 Proculus (died 281), Roman usurper
 Saint Martin of Tours (316–397),  who has spent four years of hermit life in the  island Gallinara
 Saint Veranus of Cavaillon (515–590), the remains are venerated in Cathedral of St. Michael Archangel
 Madame de Genlis (1746–1830),  she came from Lusignano  (Albenga hamlet) and   she wrote Adèle et Théodore
 Gianmario Roveraro (1936–2006), banker founder of Banca Akros and former athlete. He was first Italian athlete  to exceed 2 m in high jump.. Roveraro participated in Games of the XVI Olympiad in Melbourne
 Renato Curcio (1941), Former terrorist, publisher writer Italian writer,  he is one of the founders of Red Brigades
 Giampiero Ventura (1948),  Professional  football manager, Ventura used to be football manager of the Italian national team of football. He has started his career like football manager with the  Albenga Football.
 Ezio Madonia (1966), athlete sprinter,  he has participated in the Games of the XXIV Olympiad in  Seoul in 1988 and the Games of the XXVI Olympiad in Atlanta in 1996

Transport and Infrastructure

 Roads 
Albenga is crossed by  Via Aurelia, which connects Rome to  France. This road used to pass through the city center alongside the old town of Albenga. In  1960 was built an alternative road   which  has made possible to move all traffic outside from Albenga.
The city is  crossed  by main road, built over the past centuries, which connects with the close  Piedmont region. For this reason is called  as Piedmont road.

There are five  roads in the world called with  the name ALBENGA: four are in North America and one in the Southern Hemisphere. They are: Albenga Avenue Coral Gables, Florida; Albenga Road Northwest to Palm Bay, Florida; Southwest Albenga Avenue Port Saint Lucie, Florida; Albenga Lane in North Port, Florida and Albenga Place to Secret Harbor, Western Australia.

Highway
Albenga is accessible via the A10 motorway. Since 1969 has  started the process regarding the  project for a road that can unite the plain directly and quickly with the Val Bormida,  which it will be able to link directly Albenga to  the Piedmont region, going straight  to France and to Northern Europe. This project is called the Predosa-Albenga motorway; in 2010 has been kicked off for the final design.

Railway
Albenga has its own railway station, located on the line Genoa-Ventimiglia. The station has been  opened in 1872, but the existing train station was rebuilt by architect Roberto Narducci in  1930.

The existing railway system  has got one single track. In the new project regarding the new railway system, it will across the countryside instead of the existing one  which is crossing the coast. The new railway system will be replaced by a new double track line.
According with the new railway system the train station will be in the hamlet  of Bastia.

Airport
In the close  village  of Villanova d'Albenga there  is the Airport International "C. Panero", which has  opened in 1922. Into the airport  there is also the garrison of the 15 º Helicopters unit of'' Carabinieri (Italian gendarmerie).

Twin towns
  Dabas, Hungary (2004)

References

External links

 Official website 
 Albenga in Riviera Ligure 

Roman sites of Liguria
Italian Riviera
Cities and towns in Liguria
Towers in Italy
Second Punic War